Leo Fuhr Hjelde (born 26 August 2003) is a Norwegian professional footballer who plays as a defender for Rotherham United on loan from Premier League club Leeds United. He previously played for Ross County on loan from Celtic.

Early life
Hjelde is the son of former Nottingham Forest and Rosenborg defender Jon Olav Hjelde, who was playing for South Korean K League club Busan I'cons when Leo was born in England. Jon Olav briefly returned to England to witness Leo's birth, after which the family moved to South Korea for several months to live with Jon Olav in Busan. They returned to England in mid-2004, and subsequently moved to Norway after Jon Olav's two-year spell at Mansfield Town ended in 2007.

Club career

Celtic
On 29 July 2019, Hjelde signed a professional contract with Scottish Premiership club Celtic at 15 years old; he was brought straight into the reserve squad.

On 22 January 2021, Hjelde signed for Premiership side Ross County on loan for the remainder of the season. He made his league debut the following day against Rangers in a 5–0 defeat. He scored his first professional goal on 6 March 2021 in a 3–2 win against Kilmarnock. His performances on loan led to Ross County boss John Hughes likening the young defender to former Celtic player Virgil van Dijk.

Leeds United
On 27 August 2021, Hjelde signed for Leeds United for an undisclosed fee, signing a four-year-deal at Elland Road.

Hjelde made his senior debut for Leeds United on 9 January 2022 in the starting line-up in 2–0 FA Cup third round defeat to West Ham United. He made his Premier League debut the following week, also at West Ham, when he came on as a first-half replacement for Junior Firpo in Leeds' 3–2 win, becoming the youngest Norwegian to play in the Premier League.

On 12 January 2023, Hjelde joined EFL Championship side Rotherham United on loan for the remainder of the 2022–23 season.

Career statistics

References

External links
International statistics at the NFF 

2003 births
Living people
Footballers from Nottingham
Norwegian footballers
Association football defenders
Norway youth international footballers
Scottish Professional Football League players
Premier League players
Celtic F.C. players
Ross County F.C. players
Leeds United F.C. players
Rotherham United F.C. players
Norwegian expatriate footballers
Norwegian expatriate sportspeople in England
Expatriate footballers in England
Norwegian expatriate sportspeople in Scotland
Expatriate footballers in Scotland